Baller Magazine was a poker lifestyle magazine published in Singapore and owning media licenses in both Singapore and Hong Kong. Between 2009 and 2011, the magazine was considered the most prominent poker magazine in Asia by the Asian Poker Ratings website.

In 2011, the magazine was sold to Guangzhou Silverlight Holdings. The new owners ceased publication of Baller Magazine, instead focusing on other online initiatives that leveraged Baller's user database.

References

Card game magazines
Defunct magazines published in Singapore
English-language magazines
Magazines established in 2009
Magazines disestablished in 2011
Monthly magazines published in Singapore
Poker publications
2009 establishments in Singapore
2011 disestablishments in Singapore
Magazines published in Singapore